Heart and Soul is a 1994 album by the British pop group Five Star. It was the group's first album for three years, released independently on their own label, Tent Records. It was first released in the US in 1994, and released in the UK in 1995 featuring completely different artwork from the US version. There were three singles released from the album: I Love You (For Sentimental Reasons), I Give You Give, and Surely. Promotional videos were produced for the first two singles; I Love You (For Sentimental Reasons) was directed by Malcolm-Jamal Warner. It was commercially unsuccessful in both countries.

Track listing 
 "I Love You (For Sentimental Reasons)"
 "Surely"
 "Writing on the Wall"
 "Got a Lot of Love"
 "The Best of Me"
 "When You Get Home"
 "Going with the Moment"
 "Secret From My Heart"
 "Show Me"
 "I Give You Give"

Five Star albums
1994 albums